Georgette is a feminine given name. It may also refer to:

 Georgette (fabric), a sheer, lightweight crepe fabric
 Hurricane Georgette (disambiguation), nine tropical cyclones in the Eastern Pacific Ocean
 SS Georgette, a steamship built in 1872
 Operation Georgette, a German World War I plan resulting in the Battle of the Lys (1918)